A faliyu (pronounced phaliyum) or faliya and fali, in India is a housing cluster which comprises many families of a particular group, linked by caste, profession, or religion. Faliyas are typical of villages in Gujarat. This housing cluster is same as Pol of Ahmedabad city.

References

Housing in India
Gujarati culture
Culture of Ahmedabad